Forever Storm is a Serbian heavy metal band from Kragujevac.

History
Forever Storm was formed at the end of 2006 by Miloš Miletić (guitar), Stefan Kovačević (guitar, vocals) and Vladimir Nestorović (bass guitar). Before finding a drummer, the band recorded several demos using rhythm machine. At the beginning of 2007, they were joined by Vuk Stefanović (drums). During the same year the band competed on the 41st Gitarijada festival, also performing on the Exit festival. At the end of 2007, the band started recording their debut studio album. In 2008, the band won the first place at the Crvenka competition of rock bands. Their debut album, entitled Soul Revolution, was released at the end of 2009 through One Records, featuring a cover designed by comic book artist Bane Kerac.

In 2010, keyboardist Nikola Marić, who participated in the recording of Soul Revolution, joined the band. During the same year, the band performed on the Wacken Open Air W.E.T. stage. Forever Storm participated in a live TV show called "Rat Bendova" on Bosnian international television, OBN, with their appearance on the show leading to a regional tour. 
In July 2012. the band entered and won a contest as part of Avala Rock Fest.

During the recording of their second album, Nikola Maric left the band. That album, Tragedy, was released in December 2013 by EBM Records.

Discography

Studio albums

References

External links
Official website
Forever Storm at Encyclopaedia Metallum

 

Serbian heavy metal musical groups
Serbian thrash metal musical groups
Serbian power metal musical groups
Musical groups from Kragujevac
Musical groups established in 2006